The Prophecy of Dante is a tale in verse by Lord Byron published in 1821 (see 1821 in poetry). Written at Ravenna in June 1819, the author dedicated it to the Countess Guiccioli.

The work was positively reviewed by Francis Jeffrey, as he wrote about it: “It is a very grand, fervid, turbulent, and somewhat mystical composition, full of the highest sentiment and the highest poetry;... but disfigured by many faults of precipitation, and overclouded with many obscurities. Its great fault with common readers will be that it is not sufficiently intelligible... It is, however, beyond all question, a work of a man of great genius.”

Sources
Marino Faliero, Edinb. Rev., July, 1821, vol. 35, p. 285.

External links
 

1814 books
Poetry by Lord Byron